Gerardo Aguilar may refer to:

 Gerardo Aguilar (footballer) (born 1990), Mexican footballer
 Gerardo Aguilar Ramírez ( 2008–2010), Colombian guerilla leader